The 8th Biathlon World Championships were held in 1967 in Altenberg, in the then East Germany.

Men's results

20 km individual

4 × 7.5 km relay

Medal table

References

1967
Biathlon World Championships
International sports competitions hosted by East Germany
1967 in East German sport
Sport in Altenberg, Saxony
February 1967 sports events in Europe
Biathlon competitions in East Germany
20th century in Saxony